"The Visa" is the 55th episode of the sitcom Seinfeld. It is the 15th episode of the fourth season. It aired on January 27, 1993 on NBC. In this episode, Jerry pretends to be deeply morose in front of George's girlfriend Cheryl so as not to make George seem unfunny by comparison, and works to keep Babu Bhatt from being deported.

Plot
George meets a lawyer named Cheryl who thinks he is very funny. When he tells Jerry and Elaine, they enthusiastically plan a double date, much to George's dismay, as he imagines himself being upstaged by Jerry. At the restaurant, Elaine asks Cheryl for advice on dealing with the lawsuit from Ping, the Chinese food delivery boy whom Elaine injured in "The Virgin". Cheryl reveals that she is the prosecuting attorney in the case, as Ping is her cousin. Jerry and Elaine joke about this coincidence, making Cheryl laugh hysterically. While she is away, George makes them promise not to be funny around her. Jerry overdoes it, making comments that are so morbid that Cheryl is depressed by the end of the date.

Kramer returns early from baseball fantasy camp, where he accidentally punched Mickey Mantle. Elaine sees Cheryl with George and thanks her for persuading Ping to drop the case. She says that she did that because they all seemed like such nice people. As Elaine is giving Jerry the mail that she has been holding for him while he was out of town, Babu Bhatt, the Pakistani who Jerry tried to help in "The Cafe", is hauled off by the INS. Jerry had helped him get a job and the apartment down the hall. Jerry and Elaine discover Babu's Visa renewal form in Jerry's belated mail; it had been delivered to Jerry's address by mistake. They go to the jail where Babu is being held. When they tell him what happened he becomes angry. Jerry promises to straighten things out.

Jerry has lunch with Cheryl, where he continues his morose façade, so that he can ask her to solve Babu's problems with the INS. When she sees George, she confesses that she is attracted to Jerry's dark, disturbed personality. George, realizing his scheme has backfired, tells her the truth. Stunned at this revelation, she gets up and leaves.

At Jerry's apartment, Elaine sees Ping and thanks him for dropping the case. He sneers and tells her the case is back on because they all made Cheryl mad due to Jerry's deception. Babu's brother enters and says Babu has been deported, since Cheryl neglected to follow through on the favor after George's revelation. Back in Pakistan, Babu swears eternal vengeance against Jerry.

References

External links 
 

Seinfeld (season 4) episodes
1993 American television episodes